Coloma Township is located in Whiteside County, Illinois. As of the 2010 census, its population was 11,371 and it contained 5,162 housing units.  It consists of the area in and around Rock Falls, Illinois.

Geography

Demographics

References

External links
City-data.com
Whiteside County Official Site

1851 establishments in Illinois
Populated places established in 1851
Townships in Whiteside County, Illinois
Townships in Illinois